Pas Deh is a village in Hati Rural District, Hati District, Lali County, Khuzestan Province, Iran. At the 2006 census, its population was 86, in 12 families.

References 

Populated places in Lali County